Matthew "Matt" Nicholas Crampton (born 23 May 1986) is an English former track cyclist for . He was a member of British Cycling's Olympic Podium Programme, and represented Great Britain at a number of major events. Crampton specialised in track sprinting and competed in the individual sprint, team sprint, keirin and kilo events.

Biography
Born in Manchester, Crampton won the junior sprint and keirin events at the 2004 European Track Championships. Crampton competed at the Youth Commonwealth Games in Bendigo, Australia in 2004, winning a silver medal in the keirin.

He went on to take the silver medal as a member of England's Team Sprint squad at the 2006 Commonwealth Games. 2007 saw Crampton take the silver medal in the keirin and bronze in the team sprint at the European Track Championships, this time riding in the under 23 category.

He won a bronze medal in the individual sprint at the first round of the 2008–2009 UCI Track Cycling World Cup Classics at Manchester on 1 November 2008. He also won the Japanese Keirin Association Race the next day.

On 15 November 2008 he competed in the Revolution 21 event in Manchester. He won both events he was entered in, the Sprint and the Keirin. Other riders present were Jason Kenny, Ross Edgar and Jamie Staff.

He won silver in the men's team sprint at the 2009 UCI Track Cycling World Championships with teammates Jamie Staff and Jason Kenny. He also won silver in the same event two years later with Chris Hoy and Jason Kenny, after the French squad were stripped of the world title and the British team were promoted from their original bronze medals.

At the 2011 UEC European Track Championships, Crampton won the gold medal in the keirin.

He won gold in keirin and placed second at team sprint in Aguascalientes at 2013–14 UCI Track Cycling World Cup.

In November 2016 Crampton announced his retirement from competition, indicating that he would continue to be involved in the sport as a coach.

Family
He is the older brother of Jessica Crampton.

References

External links
Interview by Larry Hickmott, British Cycling, Melbourne, 13 March 2006

1986 births
Living people
English male cyclists
Cyclists at the 2006 Commonwealth Games
Sportspeople from Manchester
Cyclists at the 2014 Commonwealth Games
English cycling coaches
Commonwealth Games silver medallists for England
Commonwealth Games medallists in cycling
Medallists at the 2006 Commonwealth Games